McCulloch's Gold Mill, also known as Rock Engine House, North State Mine, is a historic gold mill located near Jamestown, Guilford County, North Carolina. It consists of the ruins of the McCulloch Gold Mill, built of dry laid random ashlar granite construction in 1832. The ruins consist of two walls: one 29 feet, 6 inches long; and the second 24 feet, 8 inches wide.  The second wall incorporates a chimney and Gothic arched opening.

It was listed on the National Register of Historic Places in 1979.

References

External links

Historic American Engineering Record in North Carolina
Industrial buildings and structures on the National Register of Historic Places in North Carolina
Archaeological sites on the National Register of Historic Places in North Carolina
Gothic Revival architecture in North Carolina
Industrial buildings completed in 1832
Buildings and structures in Guilford County, North Carolina
National Register of Historic Places in Guilford County, North Carolina